John Fraser was Auditor General of Canada (1905–19) and was also first cousin twice removed of the later former Auditor General Sheila Fraser.

Canadian civil servants
Year of birth missing
Year of death missing
Place of birth missing
Place of death missing
Canadian auditors